These are the Canadian number-one albums of 1990. The chart was compiled and published by RPM every Saturday.

References

See also
List of Canadian number-one singles of 1990

1990
1990 record charts
1990 in Canadian music